Pizza Guy may refer to:

People
 Informally, a male pizza delivery employee
 Salvatore D. Romano (born 1967) nicknamed "The Pizza Guy" in the press, Gambino Family mafioso

Fictional characters
 Pizza Guy, a character from the Korean-U.S. cartoon Higglytown Heroes
 Pizza Guy, a recurring character in season 6 of the sketch comedy show All That, played by Gabriel Iglesias
 Pizza Guy, a guest star character from season 3 of the cartoon Phineas and Ferb, voiced by Guy Fieri 
 Pizza Guys, a superhero duo from the season 1 episode "Cowman and Ratboy" of the cartoon Back at the Barnyard

Music
 "Pizza Guy" (2013 single), song by Touch Sensitive
 "Pizza Guy" (1995 song), a song by You Am I from their album Hi Fi Way

Other uses
 Pizza Guy, a blog run by the Finnish company Kotipizza Group
 Pizza guy, a schtick from the live call-in show WindTunnel with Dave Despain

See also

 
 Free Pizza Guy, a character from the cartoon Gravity Falls, see List of Gravity Falls characters
 Mister Pizza, Brazilian pizza chain
 Mr. Pizza, South Korean pizza chain
 Pizzaman (disambiguation)
 Pizzaboy (disambiguation) (disambiguation)
 Pizza (disambiguation)
 Guy (disambiguation)